In Greek mythology, Astydamea or Astydamia (Ancient Greek: Ἀστυδάμεια Astudámeia, derived from ἄστυ ástu, "town", and δαμάω damáo, "to tame") is a name attributed to several individuals:
 Astydamea, also known as Hippolyta, daughter of Cretheus and queen of Iolcus as the wife of Acastus. Her husband purified Peleus of the murder of King Eurytion of Phthia. Astydameia fell in love with Peleus but he scorned her. Bitter, she sent a messenger to Antigone, Peleus' wife, to tell her that Peleus was to marry Acastus' daughter, Sterope; Antigone hanged herself. Astydameia then told Acastus that Peleus had tried to rape her. Acastus believed the false accusations and tried to take revenge in Peleus by taking him on a hunting trip and leaving him unprotected as a group of Centaurs attacked. Peleus escaped death with the help of Chiron and Hermes; he pillaged Iolcus and dismembered Astydameia, then marched his army between the rended limbs.
 Astydamea, daughter of Pelops and Hippodamia. She married Alcaeus and had children by him: Amphitryon, Anaxo, and Perimede. In other accounts, the wife of Alcaeus was named Hipponome, daughter of Menoeceus or Laonome, daughter of Guneus.
 Astydamea, daughter of Phorbas and mother of Lepreus by Caucon, son of Poseidon. She persuaded Heracles to reconcile with her son, who had previously advised Augeas to cast Heracles in bonds.
 Astydamea, mother of Ctesippus by Heracles. In one source, she was the daughter of Amyntor, possibly by Kleoboule or Hippodameia. Another account makes her the daughter of Ormenus, king of Ormenion. Heracles, the same source relates, wooed her, but Ormenius would not marry her to him since Heracles was already married to Deianira. Heracles then led a war against Ormenius, killed him and took Astydameia by force. Astydameia (or Astygeneia) is also an alternate name for Astyoche, daughter of Phylas,  who bore Heracles a son Tlepolemus.
 Astydamea, was briefly mentioned by a scholiast on Euripides as the daughter of Strophius and Cydragora and sister of Pylades.

Notes

References 

Apollodorus, The Library with an English Translation by Sir James George Frazer, F.B.A., F.R.S. in 2 Volumes, Cambridge, MA, Harvard University Press; London, William Heinemann Ltd. 1921. . Online version at the Perseus Digital Library. Greek text available from the same website.
Claudius Aelianus, Varia Historia translated by Thomas Stanley (d.1700) edition of 1665. Online version at the Topos Text Project.
Claudius Aelianus, Claudii Aeliani de natura animalium libri xvii, varia historia, epistolae, fragmenta, Vol 2. Rudolf Hercher. In Aedibus B.G. Teubneri. Lipsiae. 1866. Greek text available at the Perseus Digital Library.
Diodorus Siculus, The Library of History translated by Charles Henry Oldfather. Twelve volumes. Loeb Classical Library. Cambridge, Massachusetts: Harvard University Press; London: William Heinemann, Ltd. 1989. Vol. 3. Books 4.59–8. Online version at Bill Thayer's Web Site
Diodorus Siculus, Bibliotheca Historica. Vol 1-2. Immanel Bekker. Ludwig Dindorf. Friedrich Vogel. in aedibus B. G. Teubneri. Leipzig. 1888–1890. Greek text available at the Perseus Digital Library.
 Fowler, R. L. (2000), Early Greek Mythography: Volume 1: Text and Introduction, Oxford University Press, 2000. .
Fowler, Robert L., Early Greek Mythography. Volume 2: Commentary. Oxford University Press. Great Clarendon Street, Oxford, OX2 6DP, United Kingdom. 2013. 
Pausanias, Description of Greece with an English Translation by W.H.S. Jones, Litt.D., and H.A. Ormerod, M.A., in 4 Volumes. Cambridge, MA, Harvard University Press; London, William Heinemann Ltd. 1918. . Online version at the Perseus Digital Library
Pausanias, Graeciae Descriptio. 3 vols. Leipzig, Teubner. 1903.  Greek text available at the Perseus Digital Library.
Pindar, Odes translated by Diane Arnson Svarlien. 1990. Nemean Odes: Online version at the Perseus Digital Library. Olympian Odes: Online version at the Perseus Digital Library.
Pindar, The Odes of Pindar including the Principal Fragments with an Introduction and an English Translation by Sir John Sandys, Litt.D., FBA. Cambridge, MA., Harvard University Press; London, William Heinemann Ltd. 1937. Nemean Odes: Greek text available at the Perseus Digital Library. Olympian Odes: Greek text available at the Perseus Digital Library.

Princesses in Greek mythology
Queens in Greek mythology
Women of Heracles
Characters from Iolcus
Elean mythology